Aliens Area (stylized in all caps) is a Japanese manga series written and illustrated by Fusai Naba. It was serialized in Shueisha's Weekly Shōnen Jump magazine from June to October 2022, with its chapters collected into three tankōbon volumes.

Plot
High schooler Tatsumi Tatsunami lost his parents at a young age and now works multiple part-time jobs to support himself and his younger siblings. However, it turns out his right arm holds a very powerful piece of alien technology, and other aliens want it. However, after being saved by the strange man, Hajime Sharaku, Tatsunami is offered the chance of a lifetime: to work with him at Section 5 of the Foreign Affairs Division and help protect earth from extra terrestrial threats. To support his sibling, Tatsumi takes it, starting his adventure.

Characters
Tatsumi Tatsunami
One of the main protagonists. He lost his parents in a fire and needs to work multiple part-time jobs to support his siblings. In his right arm holds an advanced form of alien technology, which allows him to change and alter his arm's shape.

Hajime Sharaku
One of the main protagonists. He is an investigator for Section 5. He has a cane that doubles as a taser, and a wrist brace that grants him anti-gravity abilities.

Publication
Written and illustrated by Fusai Naba, the series was serialized in Shueisha's Weekly Shōnen Jump magazine from June 6 to October 24, 2022. Three tankōbon volumes were published from October 4, 2022, to February 3, 2023.

Viz Media and Manga Plus are publishing chapters of the series in English simultaneously with their Japanese release.

Volume list

Reception
Todd Petrella from Screen Rant felt the pilot chapter was rushed, though noted that it was likely done to try to avoid early cancellation. Despite that, he offered praise to the overall premise.

Further reading

References

External links
  
 
 

Action anime and manga
Fantasy anime and manga
Shōnen manga
Shueisha manga
Viz Media manga